Lamour Desrances (also spelled L'Amour Desrances, Lamour Derance, and Lamour Dérance) was a Haitian revolutionary leader. A former maroon, he was born in Africa and brought to Saint-Domingue as a slave. During the revolution, when local figures often gained power in control of small armed forces, Desrances became a local military leader in the mountains surrounding Port-au-Prince and Saint-Marc.

At the time of the War of Knives, Desrances was loyal to André Rigaud in his battle with Toussaint Louverture, and was one of the few black officers in the predominantly mulatto northern Rigaud-loyal army. After Rigaud's defeat by Louverture, Desrances is referred to as a rebel in Louverture's autobiography. Céligny Ardouin argues that Louverture and Jean-Jacques Dessalines saw Desrances as a growing rival due to his power in the region, and determined to defeat him. Louverture marched on Desrances' forces in November 1801, and they scattered into the local forest.

Two months later, the French forces arrived under Charles Leclerc and during L'Ouverture's open conflict with the French, Desrances notably changed his loyalty to the French under General Pampile de Lacroix to fight against Dessalines' forces. An enemy of L'Ouverture in both instances, L'Ouverture wrote of him: "L’Amour Desrances, who had caused all the inhabitants of the Plain of Cul-de-Sac to be assassinated; who urged the laborers to revolt; who pillaged all this part of the island." The combined force of French and Desrances' and others' local militias defeated Dessalines army at Port-au-Prince and forced their retreat.

References

Haitian rebel slaves
People of the Haitian Revolution